is the 37th single by the Japanese idol group AKB48. It was released in Japan on August 27, 2014. It was the 5th best-selling single of the year in Japan, with 1,058,059 copies.

2014 general election 
The lineup for the title track and supporting B-sides was determined by the results from the AKB48's 2014 general election.  Mayu Watanabe of AKB48's Team B received the most votes and became the center, or headlining performer, for the single.

Promotion and release 
The single was released in five types: Type A (two versions: regular and limited), Type K (regular and limited), Type B (regular and limited), Type D (regular and limited) and the Theater Edition.

The lyrics of the song were written by Yasushi Akimoto, the music composed by Yusuke Itagaki.

The full version of MV has not been released along with the single "Kibouteki Refrain", and due to the delay, was released a week later, on December 1.

Reception 
The single debuted at number one in the Oricon Daily Singles Chart with 871,923 copies sold on the first day. It reached number-one on the weekly Oricon Singles Chart.

Track list

Type A

Type B

Type C

Type D

Theater edition

Personnel

"Kokoro no Placard" 
The lineup for the title track consists of the top 16 members from AKB48's 2014 general election.
The center performer for the track is Mayu Watanabe
 AKB48 Team A: Rina Kawaei, Haruna Kojima, Haruka Shimazaki, Minami Takahashi
 AKB48 Team K: Yui Yokoyama
 AKB48 Team B: Yuki Kashiwagi, Mayu Watanabe
 SKE48 Team S: Jurina Matsui
 SKE48 Team E: Aya Shibata, Akari Suda, Rena Matsui
 NMB48 Team N: Sayaka Yamamoto
 HKT48 Team H: Rino Sashihara
 HKT48 Team KIV: Sakura Miyawaki
 SNH48 Team SII: Sae Miyazawa
 Nogizaka46: Rina Ikoma

"Dareka ga Nageta Ball" 
Performed by Undergirls, which consist of members who ranked 17 to 32 in AKB48's 2014 general election.
 AKB48 Team A: Anna Iriyama, Tomu Muto
 AKB48 Team K: Rie Kitahara
 AKB48 Team B: Aki Takajo, Juri Takahashi
 AKB48 Team 4: Rena Kato, Yuria Kizaki, Minami Minegishi
 SKE48 Team S: Masana Oya
 SKE48 Team KII: Akane Takayanagi
 SKE48 Kenkyusei: Kaori Matsumura
 Team M: Nana Yamada
 Team BII: Miyuki Watanabe
 Team H: Haruka Kodama
 Team KIV: Mio Tomonaga, Madoka Moriyasu

"Hito Natsu no Hankouki" 
Performed by Next Girls, which consist of members who ranked 33 to 48 in AKB48's 2014 general election.
 AKB48 Team K: Mako Kojima, Yuka Tano 
 AKB48 Team 4: Yukari Sasaki
 SKE48 Team S: Haruka Futamura
 SKE48 Team KII: Yukiko Kinoshita, Airi Furukawa
 SKE48 Team E: Kyoka Isohara, Tsugumi Iwanaga
 Team M: Miru Shiroma, Reina Fujie, Fuuko Yagura
 Team BII: Ayaka Umeda
 Team H: Chihiro Anai, Meru Tashima
 Team KIV: Aika Ota, Aoi Motomura

"Seikaku ga Warui Onna no Ko" 
Performed by Future Girls, which consist of members who ranked 49 to 64 in AKB48's 2014 general election.
AKB48 Team K - Haruka Ishida, Misaki Iwasa
AKB48 Team B - Natsuki Uchiyama, Asuka Kuramochi
AKB48 Team 4 - Nana Okada, Miki Nishino
SKE48 Team KII - Mina Oba, Nao Furuhata, Yamada Mizuho
SKE48 Team E - Kanon Kimoto
NMB48 Team N - Riho Kotani, Kei Jonishi
NMB48 Team BII - Miori Ichikawa, Shu Yabushita
HKT48 Team H - Riko Sakaguchi, Natsumi Matsuoka
Center - Misaki Iwasa

"Chewing Gum no Aji ga Naku Naru Made" 
Performed by Upcoming Girls, which consist of members who ranked 65 to 80 in AKB48's 2014 general election.

JKT48 Version 

JKT48 released their 7th single Papan Penanda Isi Hati -Message on a Placard- on 27 August 2014 with Shania Junianatha as this single's center. This CD (JKT48 Theater and Rakuten version) has tickets to Pensi JKT48 (Art Show).

Track listing 
The single has three versions: Regular Edition distributed by CD Shops (CD+DVD), Regular Edition distributed by JKT48 Theater and Rakuten (CD+DVD), and Theater Edition (CD only).

Regular edition 

Bonus
 Photopack
 PENSI JKT48 Ticket (only on ones distributed by JKT48 Theater and Rakuten)

Theater edition

Bonus
 JKT48 Trump Card
 Handshake ticket

Personnel 
Center: Shania Junianatha
Team J: Beby Chaesara Anadila, Devi Kinal Putri, Haruka Nakagawa, Jessica Vania, Jessica Veranda, Melody Nurramdhani Laksani, Nabilah Ratna Ayu Azalia, Rezky Wiranti Dhike, Thalia Ivanka Elizabeth
Team KIII: Cindy Yuvia, Ratu Vienny Fitrilya, Rina Chikano, Riskha Fairunissa, Shinta Naomi, Thalia

Charts

References 

AKB48 songs
2014 songs
2014 singles
Songs with lyrics by Yasushi Akimoto
King Records (Japan) singles
Oricon Weekly number-one singles
Billboard Japan Hot 100 number-one singles